Jerry Yanuyanutawa (born 10 April 1985 in Suva, Fiji) is a  Fijian former international rugby union player who played at Prop. He formerly played for Glasgow Warriors.

Rugby Union career

Amateur career

Yanuyanutawa began his rugby union career playing for Sydney University RFC.

While at Glasgow Warriors he occasionally played for Ayr and Glasgow Hawks.

Professional career

Yanuyanutawa made his debut for the Brumbies in the 2010 Super 14 season.

He joined London Irish in August 2012.

In July 2013, he signed for Scottish side Glasgow Warriors joining fellow flying Fijian, Nikola Matawalu He was part of the Warriors side that won the 2015 Pro12 Grand Final.

A Warrior Nation favourite he left the club at the end of the 2015-16 season to go to Australia.

International career

He grew up in Fiji, where he represented their Under 21 side. He was later capped by the senior side.

Teaching

Yanuyanutawa is now a teacher in Canberra, Australia.

References

External links
Brumbies profile

1985 births
Living people
Fijian rugby union players
ACT Brumbies players
London Irish players
Glasgow Warriors players
Fijian expatriate rugby union players
Expatriate rugby union players in Australia
Expatriate rugby union players in England
Expatriate rugby union players in Scotland
Fijian expatriate sportspeople in Scotland
Fijian expatriate sportspeople in Australia
Fijian expatriate sportspeople in England
Sportspeople from Suva
I-Taukei Fijian people
Ayr RFC players
Glasgow Hawks players
Fiji international rugby union players
People educated at Suva Grammar School
Rugby union props